Mykola Belokurov (3 October 1926 – 30 August 2006) was a Soviet middle-distance runner. He competed in the men's 1500 metres at the 1952 Summer Olympics.

References

External links
 

1926 births
2006 deaths
Athletes (track and field) at the 1952 Summer Olympics
Soviet male middle-distance runners
Olympic athletes of the Soviet Union
Place of birth missing